The Public Academy for Performing Arts (PAPA) charter school is located in Albuquerque, New Mexico.

PAPA offers many courses to its students who are in grades six through twelve. PAPA offers ballet, jazz, flamenco, hip-hop, and contemporary dance, choir, band, orchestra, theater, visual arts, film making and photography. They used to offer fencing and cheerleading, as well as karate, but those courses were dropped due to budget cuts.  One can go on to their website and donate.

Governing Council
Although it is part of the Albuquerque Public Schools District, PAPA is a charter school, and as such is responsible for its own operation, including preparation of a budget, contracting for services and personnel matters. To this point, PAPA is governed by a Governing Council which sets policies for the school in accordance with its charter. PAPA's Governing Council currently consists of parents and community members with faculty and staff as advisory, non-voting members.  The Governing Council meets monthly, with dates, times and location bring posted on the PAPA notice board and web site.

Admission to PAPA
Admission to PAPA is by lottery, and participation in the lottery system is open to all students throughout New Mexico. Current PAPA students are automatically entitled to enroll the following year, without participation in the lottery. Siblings or current students (who have attended PAPA at least one year) will have priority for admission in future years, subject purely to space availability.

Performing Arts at PAPA
- PAPA hosts an annual Spring Dance Show every school year and one musical every school year

- Senior Showcase is a production that allows seniors to show what they did during their years at PAPA

- Dance - Including Hip-Hop, Jazz, Contemporary, Ballet, and Flamenco. 
- Film And Media - Yearbook, Broadcasting 
- Theatre - Drama, Productions, Musical Theatre 
- Music - Choir, Guitar, Band, Orchestra, Music Technology, and Music Theory, and Piano. 
- Visual Arts

References

External links
 Official school website

High schools in Albuquerque, New Mexico
Charter schools in New Mexico
Public high schools in New Mexico
Public middle schools in New Mexico